William Bourchier may refer to:
 William Bourchier (priest) (1852–1924), Dean of Cashel
 William Bourchier, 1st Count of Eu (1374–1420), English knight
 William Bourchier, 9th Baron FitzWarin (1407–1470), English nobleman
 William Bourchier, 3rd Earl of Bath (1557–1623), Lord Lieutenant of Devon